William Hamilton may refer to:

Academics 
Robert William Hamilton Jr. (1930–2011), known as Bill, American hyperbaric physiologist 
William Hamilton (university principal) (1669–1732), Principal of the University of Edinburgh
William Hamilton (surgeon) (died 1717), surgeon in the British East India Company
Sir William Hamilton, 9th Baronet (1788–1856), Scottish metaphysician
William Rowan Hamilton (1805–1865), mathematician, astronomer and physicist who lived in Dublin in the United Kingdom of Great Britain and Ireland
William Edwin Hamilton (1834–1902), son of William Rowan and publisher of his Elements of Quaternions (1866)
William Hamilton (geologist) (1805–1867), English geologist
William F. Hamilton (physician) (1893–1964), American physician
William F. Hamilton (professor) (born 1941), professorship of management and technology
William Hamilton (theologian) (1924–2012), American theologian
W. D. Hamilton (1936–2000), British evolutionary biologist and geneticist
Bill Hamilton (agricultural scientist) (1909–1992), New Zealand agricultural scientist and scientific administrator
Willie Hamilton (academic) (born 1958), expert in cancer diagnosis
William Baskerville Hamilton, historian

Artists
William Hamilton (painter) (1751–1801), English painter
William Hamilton Gibson (1850–1896), American illustrator, author and naturalist 
William Hamilton (cartoonist) (1939–2016), American cartoonist associated with The New Yorker

Businessmen
William Hamilton (lumber baron) (died 1822), lumber merchant and political figure in Upper Canada
Bill Hamilton (engineer) (1899–1978), New Zealand engineer and inventor
William Hamilton and Company, British shipbuilding firm

Criminals
William Hamilton (criminal), criminal who shot at Queen Victoria in 1849
Billy Ray Hamilton (died 2007), American murderer

Poets 
William Hamilton (comic poet) (1665–1751), Scottish poet
William Hamilton (Jacobite poet) (1704–1754), Scottish poet associated with the Jacobite movement
William Hamilton (British Army officer) (c. 1896–1917), poet and soldier from Victoria Barracks, Windsor

Politics

Australasia
William Hamilton (Australian politician) (1858–1920), Queensland politician
William John Warburton Hamilton, administrator, explorer, and politician in New Zealand

Canada
William Ernest Hamilton (1902–1985), Ontario politician
William McLean Hamilton (1919–1989), Canadian politician

United States
William S. Hamilton (1797–1850), son of Alexander Hamilton, well-known miner, politician, and commander
William W. Hamilton (1810–1866), English-born American politician from Iowa
William Hamilton (abolitionist) (1773–1836), abolitionist and orator
William Hamilton (Flint politician) (died 1878), American politician
William Thomas Hamilton (1820–1888), Governor of Maryland (1880–1884)
William J. Hamilton (1932–2019), American politician
Bill Hamilton (West Virginia politician) (born 1950), American state legislator in West Virginia
G. William Hamilton (1933-2022), American politician and businessman

United Kingdom
William Hamilton (Lord Chancellor) (died 1307), Lord Chancellor of England
William Hamilton, 2nd Duke of Hamilton (1616–1651), Scottish nobleman
William Hamilton, Duke of Hamilton (1635–1694), Scottish nobleman
William Gerard Hamilton (1729–1796), English statesman
Sir William Hamilton (diplomat) (1730–1803), Scottish diplomat and husband of Emma Hamilton
William Hamilton, 11th Duke of Hamilton (1811–1863), Scottish nobleman
William Douglas-Hamilton, 12th Duke of Hamilton (1845–1895), Scottish nobleman
Willie Hamilton (1917–2000), British Labour MP
Lord William Hamilton (1700s–1734), member of parliament for Lanarkshire
Sir William Hamilton of Sanquhar, pursemaster for James V

Sportsmen 
William Hamilton (cricketer) (1859–1914), Irish cricketer
William Hamilton (cyclist) (1930–2017), Canadian Olympic cyclist
William Hamilton (footballer) (1903–?), Scottish footballer
Billy Hamilton (baseball, born 1866) (1866–1940), 19th century American Major League baseball player
Billy Hamilton (baseball, born 1990) (born 1990), 21st century American Major League baseball player
William Hamilton (tennis player) (1869–1943), Irish tennis player
William Hamilton (athlete) (1883–1955), 1908 Olympic gold medalist
William Hamilton (sport shooter) (1884–1939), Canadian Olympic shooter
William Hamilton (equestrian) (1921–2007), Swedish Olympic equestrian
Willie Hamilton (footballer, born 1938) (1938–1976), Scottish footballer
Willie Hamilton (footballer, born 1889) (1889–1921), Scottish footballer
Bill Hamilton (rugby league) (born 1945), Australian rugby league footballer
Billy Hamilton (footballer) (born 1957), Northern Irish footballer
Pud Hamilton (William Hamilton, 1874–1965), Canadian ice hockey player

Others 
William Hamilton (antiquarian) (died 1724), Scottish topographer and genealogist, grandfather of William Gerard Hamilton
William Richard Hamilton (1777–1859), English antiquarian and traveler
William Peter Hamilton (1867–1929), Wall Street Journal editor
William Hamilton (film editor) (1893–1942), film editor
Bill Hamilton, bassist for the Canadian band Silverstein
William Hamilton (physician) (1758–1790), Scottish physician and botanist
William Hamilton (Irish minister) (1755–1797), Irish Protestant minister, geologist, meteorologist and antiquarian
William Thomas Hamilton (frontiersman) (1822–1908), English-born American frontiersman and author
William Hamilton (actor), Irish stage actor of the eighteenth century
 William Hamilton (priest), Archdeacon of Armagh
William G. Hamilton (1932–2022), American physician
Bill Hamilton (journalist), Washington editor for The New York Times
 William L. Hamilton, Shaken and Stirred columnist for The New York Times